The 1911 International cricket season was from April 1911 to August 1911.

Season overview

June

Test trial in England

All India in England

July

Netherlands in Belgium

Ireland in Scotland

August

India in Scotland

References

1911 in cricket